= Lamar Hunt Trophy =

Trophies named the Lamar Hunt Trophy are given to the winners of the following American football games:

- AFC Championship Game in the National Football League
- Border War (Kansas–Missouri rivalry) college football game

== See also ==
- Lamar Hunt U.S. Open Cup, the oldest national soccer tournament in the US
